Barbara Fuller is a former lawn bowls international for England.

Bowls career
She won a bronze medal in the fours with Brenda Atherton, Madge Allan and Mary Price at the 1986 Commonwealth Games. Two years later she won a silver medal in the women's triples with Norma Shaw and Jayne Roylance during the 1988 World Outdoor Bowls Championship in Auckland.

In addition she has also won two National titles representing Middlesex.

References

English female bowls players
Commonwealth Games bronze medallists for England
Bowls players at the 1986 Commonwealth Games
Commonwealth Games medallists in lawn bowls
Living people
Year of birth missing (living people)
Medallists at the 1986 Commonwealth Games